The Arabic star is a punctuation mark added to Unicode 1.1 because the asterisk (*) might appear similar to a Star of David in its six-lobed form (✻).

The Arabic star is given a distinct character in Unicode, in the range Arabic punctuation.

Variants
In many modern fonts, however, the asterisk is five-pointed, and the Arabic star is sometimes six- or eight-pointed. The two symbols are compared below (the display depends on your browser's font).

Unicode
In Unicode, Arabic and similar stars are encoded at:

 
 

In some displays, the use of the ٭ character can cause the text directionality to change.

See also
Star (glyph)

References

External links
Windows Programming/Unicode/Character reference/0000-0FFF
Star Symbol

Arabic punctuation and symbols